The 1947 Minnesota Golden Gophers football team represented the University of Minnesota in the 1947 Big Nine Conference football season. In their 13th year under head coach Bernie Bierman, the Golden Gophers compiled a 6–3 record and outscored their opponents by a combined total of 174 to 127.
 
Guard Leo Nomellini was named All-Big Ten. Guard Larry Olsonoski was awarded the Team MVP Award.

Total attendance for the season was 289,612, which averaged to 57,922. The season high for attendance was against Purdue.

Schedule

Game summaries

Michigan

In the fifth week of the season, Minnesota a close game against Michigan by a score of 13–6. Michigan scored first on a long touchdown pass from Bob Chappuis to Bump Elliott. The final touchdown in the fourth quarter followed a 24-yard interception return by Jack Weisenburger to the Minnesota 21-yard line. Gene Derricotte scored after faking to the right and then running through a hole on the left side and into the end zone. Chappuis was held to 26 rushing yards, less than two yards per carry.

References

Minnesota
Minnesota Golden Gophers football seasons
Minnesota Golden Gophers football